Paul Keenan is a songwriter and producer based in Dumbarton, near Glasgow in Scotland. He is best known for co-founding the successful UK dance act Uniting Nations along with its other co-founding member Daz Sampson, Together they had four hit singles, "Out of Touch", "You and Me", "Ai No Corrida" and "Do It Yourself". 

In addition co-founder, producer and songwriter of 2020 established synthwave project FHE. As FHE he has released popular singles such as the Haddaway collaboration 'Part Of You', 'Crucifix Of Light', which contains a chorus sample from the 1987 released 'Cry Little Sister (Theme from The Lost Boys)'. Furthermore original singles such as 'Mirror' and 'Beg For More'.

Discography

Albums
as part of Uniting Nations
2005 One World

Singles
as part of Uniting Nations

References 

Living people
Officers in Scottish police forces
Scottish police officers
Scottish record producers
Scottish songwriters
1976 births